Pond Creek is an unincorporated community located  in Wood County, West Virginia, United States, situated along the Ohio River at the mouth of Pond Creek.

References 

Unincorporated communities in West Virginia
Unincorporated communities in Wood County, West Virginia
West Virginia populated places on the Ohio River